Isaac is a statue by Epitacio Calvo.

One copy is installed in a fountain across from Alameda Central in Mexico City, Mexico.

References

1860s sculptures
Outdoor sculptures in Mexico City
Sculptures of men in Mexico
Statues in Mexico City